The 1991 Bath City Council election was held on Thursday 2 May 1991 to elect councillors to Bath City Council in England. It took place on the same day as other district council elections in the United Kingdom. One third of seats were up for election. Two seats were contested in Bathwick due to an extra vacancy occurring.

Results summary

Ward results
Sitting councillors seeking re-election, elected in 1987, are marked with an asterisk (*). The ward results listed below are based on the changes from the 1990 elections, not taking into account any party defections or by-elections.

Abbey

Bathwick

Bloomfield

Combe Down

Kingsmead

Lambridge

Lansdown

Lyncombe

Newbridge

Oldfield

Southdown

Twerton

Walcot

Westmoreland

Weston

Widcombe

References

1991 English local elections
1991
1990s in Somerset